The Russian Soviet Government Bureau (1919-1921), sometimes known as the "Soviet Bureau," was an unofficial diplomatic organization established by the Russian Soviet Federative Socialist Republic in the United States during the Russian Civil War. The Soviet Bureau primarily functioned as a trade and information agency of the Soviet government. Suspected of engaging in political subversion, the Soviet Bureau was raided by law enforcement authorities at the behest of the Lusk Committee of the New York State legislature in 1919. The Bureau was terminated early in 1921.

History

Establishment
Sometime in January 1919 a courier acting on behalf of the government of Soviet Russia contacted Ludwig C.A.K. Martens, a respected editor of Novyi Mir, the newspaper of the Russian Socialist Federation of the Socialist Party of America, appointing him its representative in the United States. A search warrant was served  and "every shred of written or printed paper" was removed from the premises, material which was later parsed at the Lusk Committee's leisure for evidence of illegal seditious activity and further radical connections for the committee to explore.

The Soviet Bureau vociferously protested the Lusk Committee's action:    The invasion of the office of the Russian Soviet Government was altogether unwarranted and illegal. The Russian Soviet Government Bureau has conscientiously refrained from interfering in American affairs. Its activities have always been open to investigation by anyone honestly in search of information about Soviet Russia or about the activities of the Bureau. Only the existing state of hysterical reaction diligently nursed by a persistent campaign of slander against Soviet Russia can explain why such drastic steps were taken in a case where a simple inquiry would have brought out all the information necessary — without breaking the law and the first principles of international hospitality."      Martens, who had gone underground and often hid at Julius Hammer's home, was subsequently subpoenaed and called before the committee to give testimony.

Hearings
The organization was a subject of hearings in United States Senate from January through March 1920. On December 17, 1920, the United States Department of Labor decided to deport Martens.

In January 1921 Martens finally left the United States. Work of the organization stopped with the departure of its leader.

Key participants

 Boris Roustam Bek
 Evans Clark
 Jacob W. Hartmann
 A.A. Heller

 Leo A. Heubsch
 Morris Hillquit
 Isaac A. Hourwich
 Eva Joffe

 George V. Lomonossoff
 Ludwig Martens
 Santeri Nuorteva
 Gregory Weinstein

Publications

Official organs

 Information Bulletin —Small weekly newspaper first issued March 3, 1919.
 Soviet Russia —Weekly magazine first issued June 7, 1919.
 Volume 1: June to December 1919.
 Volume 2: January to June 1920.
 Volume 3: July to December 1920.
 Volumes 4 and 5: 1921.
 Volumes 6 and 7: 1922.
 Volume 8: 1923.
 Volume 9: 1924. —Called Soviet Russia Pictorial, terminated October 1924.

Pamphlets
 The Labor Laws of Soviet Russia: With an Answer to a Criticism by Mr. William C. Redfield. Third Edition. New York: Russian Soviet Government Bureau, 1920.
 The Marriage Laws of Soviet Russia: Complete Text of First Code of Laws of the Russian Socialist Federal Soviet Republic Dealing with Civil Status, Domestic Relations, Marriage, the Family and Guardianship. New York: Russian Soviet Government Bureau, 1921.

See also
 Amtorg Trading Corporation aka AMTORG (NYC)
 All Russian Co-operative Society aka ARCOS (London)

References

Further reading
 "Stevenson's 'Personally Conducted' Raid," New York Call, vol. 12, no. 166 (June 15, 1919), pg. 8.
 Ludwig C.A.K. Martens, "Soviet Envoy Martens' Farewell Message to America," The Toiler, whole no. 157 (Feb. 5, 1921), pg. 1.
 Ludwig C.A.K. Martens, "Statement of Ludwig C.A.K. Martens on the Activities of the Soviet Mission: Moscow — Feb. 24, 1921." Department of Justice Bureau of Investigation files, NARA M-1085, reel 934. Corvallis, OR: 1000 Flowers Publishing, 2007.
 Archibald E. Stevenson (ed.) Revolutionary Radicalism: Its History, Purpose and Tactics with an Exposition and Discussion of the Steps being Taken and Required to Curb It: Filed April 24, 1920, in the Senate of the State of New York, Published in 4 volumes. Part 1: Revolutionary and Subversive Movements Abroad and At Home, Vol. 1. Albany, NY: Lyon, 1920.

External links
 Tim Davenport, "Russian Soviet Government Bureau (1919-21)", Early American Marxism website, www.marxisthistory.org/

Soviet state institutions
Organizations established in 1919
1921 disestablishments in the United States
Soviet Union–United States relations
Diplomatic missions of Russia
De facto embassies
Defunct diplomatic missions in the United States